Moisés Emilio Reuben was a Canadian soccer player who played as a striker.

Career
Reuben played in Argentina, Brazil, Colombia and Uruguay for Vélez Sársfield, Independiente, Lanús, Flamengo, Deportivo Cali and Racing Club de Montevideo. On 5 September 1948, Reuben scored two goals as Deportivo Cali defeated Atlético Municipal 4–1 to record their first victory in the 1948 Campeonato Profesional, the first season of Colombia's top-flight football league.

References

Year of birth missing
Year of death missing
Canadian soccer players
Association football forwards
Club Atlético Vélez Sarsfield footballers
Club Atlético Independiente footballers
Club Atlético Lanús footballers
CR Flamengo footballers
Deportivo Cali footballers
Racing Club de Montevideo players
Argentine Primera División players
Categoría Primera A players
Canadian expatriate soccer players
Canadian expatriate sportspeople in Argentina
Expatriate footballers in Argentina
Canadian expatriate sportspeople in Brazil
Expatriate footballers in Brazil
Canadian expatriate sportspeople in Colombia
Expatriate footballers in Colombia
Canadian expatriate sportspeople in Uruguay
Expatriate footballers in Uruguay